Daan King Building, or Ta Ann King Building, is a skyscraper office building located in South District, Taichung, Taiwan. The building was completed in 1994 and was one of the earliest skyscrapers in Taichung as well as the first building to reach more than 40 floors in the city. Daan King Building and Daan International Building located on the opposite side of the road are commonly known as Taichung Twin Towers, as the two buildings have almost the same appearance, however their completion dates are different by three years. As of January 2021, it is the 20th tallest building in Taichung.

See also 
 List of tallest buildings in Taiwan
 List of tallest buildings in Taichung

References

1994 establishments in Taiwan
Buildings and structures in Taichung
Skyscraper office buildings in Taichung
Office buildings completed in 1994